Ricardo Tabarelli (born 7 February 1942) is a Paraguayan footballer. He played in five matches for the Paraguay national football team from 1963 to 1970. He was also part of Paraguay's squad for the 1963 South American Championship.

References

External links
 

1942 births
Living people
Paraguayan footballers
Paraguay international footballers
Place of birth missing (living people)
Association football defenders